Ostropa is a lichen genus in the family Stictidaceae. It is a monotypic genus, consisting of the single species Ostropa barbara.

References

Ostropales
Lichen genera
Ostropales genera
Taxa named by Elias Magnus Fries
Taxa described in 1825